"Woodstock" is a song written by Joni Mitchell. At least four notable versions of the song were released in the same year, 1970. Mitchell's own version was first performed live in 1969 and appeared in April 1970 on her album Ladies of the Canyon and as the B-side to her single "Big Yellow Taxi". This publication was preceded by Crosby, Stills, Nash & Young's cover version, which appeared on their March 1970 album Déjà Vu and became a staple of classic rock radio and the best-known version in the United States. A third version, by the British band Matthews Southern Comfort became the best known version in the United Kingdom, and was the highest charting version of the song, reaching the top of the UK singles chart in 1970. A fourth version by studio project The Assembled Multitude also became a chart hit.

The song's lyrics refer to the Woodstock Music and Arts Festival of 1969, telling the story of a concert-goer on a trek to attend the festival. Mitchell, who was unable to actually perform at the festival herself due to scheduling conflicts, was inspired to write the song based on an account of the festival relayed to her by then-boyfriend Graham Nash, who had performed there. The anthemic song, as well as the festival it commemorates, is symbolic of the counterculture of the 1960s.

Lyrics 
Joni Mitchell composed the song based on what she had heard from her then-boyfriend Graham Nash about the Woodstock Music and Art Festival. She had not been there herself, since a manager had told her that it would, instead, be more advantageous for her to appear on The Dick Cavett Show. She composed it in a hotel room in New York City, watching televised reports of the festival. "The deprivation of not being able to go provided me with an intense angle on Woodstock," she told an interviewer shortly after the event. David Crosby, interviewed for the documentary Joni Mitchell: Woman of Heart and Mind, stated that Mitchell had captured the feeling and importance of the Woodstock festival better than anyone who had actually been there.

The lyrics tell a story about a spiritual journey to Max Yasgur's farm, the place of the festival, and make prominent use of sacred imagery, comparing the festival site with the Garden of Eden ("and we've got to get ourselves back to the garden"). The saga commences with the narrator's encounter of a fellow traveler ("Well, I came upon a child of God, he was walking along the road") and concludes at their ultimate destination ("by the time we got to Woodstock, we were half a million strong").
There are also references to the horrific "mutual assured destruction" of the Cold War ("bombers riding shotgun in the sky...") contrasted against the peaceful intent of the festival goers ("...turning into butterflies above our nation").

Releases and cover versions

Joni Mitchell 
Prior to its release on any album, Mitchell performed "Woodstock" at the 1969 Big Sur Folk Festival, one month after Woodstock. The solo performance can be seen in the festival concert film Celebration at Big Sur, released in 1971. Mitchell had not yet developed her distaste for large festival gigs. Released on Mitchell's third album Ladies of the Canyon in March 1970, "Woodstock" served as the B-side for that album's single "Big Yellow Taxi". Mitchell re-recorded "Woodstock" for her two live albums, Miles of Aisles and Shadows and Light. The original track was included on the 1996 compilation Hits. Mitchell's original version featured a stark and haunting arrangement – a solo vocal, multi-tracked backing vocals, and a tremoloed Wurlitzer electric piano, all performed by Mitchell.

Crosby, Stills, Nash & Young 

About the same time that Ladies of the Canyon appeared, Crosby, Stills, Nash & Young's upbeat hard rock arrangement was released as the lead single from their 1970 Déjà Vu album. This version opens with a lead guitar riff played by Neil Young, who also plays the solo. Stephen Stills sings the lead vocal with backing harmonies from David Crosby, Graham Nash, and Young. The Crosby, Stills, Nash & Young version of "Woodstock" is also notable for the stop-time instrument patterns, just prior to the "We are stardust, we are golden..." chorus.

Crosby, Stills, Nash & Young had learned the song from Mitchell herself, who was Nash's girlfriend at the time, but the band's version introduced major changes in tone. Jimi Hendrix was involved early in the song's development, and a recording taped on 30 September 1969, half a year before the album came out, with Hendrix playing bass and overdubbing guitar was released in 2018 on the album Both Sides of the Sky.  Sound engineer Eddie Kramer stated that with Jimi "... helping the song along, it sounds like Crosby, Stills & Hendrix".  The final version had Stephen Stills singing a slightly rearranged version of Mitchell's lyrics which put the line, "we are billion year old carbon" — which only appeared in her final chorus — into each of the first three choruses.  Then that line was replaced with "we are caught in the devil's bargain" in the last chorus, which was also in Mitchell's final chorus.

"Woodstock" was one of the few Déjà Vu tracks where Crosby, Stills, Nash, and Young all performed their parts in the same session. Later the original lead vocal by Stephen Stills was partly replaced with a later vocal recorded by Stills, who recalled: "I replaced one and a half verses that were excruciatingly out of tune." Neil Young disagreed, saying that "the track was magic. Then later on [Crosby, Stills & Nash] were in the studio nitpicking [with the result that] Stephen erased the vocal and put another one on that wasn't nearly as good."

The Crosby, Stills, Nash & Young version of "Woodstock" peaked at #11 on the Billboard Hot 100 in May 1970 and #3 in Canada. A different recording of "Woodstock" by Crosby, Stills, Nash & Young was played under the closing credits of the documentary film Woodstock released March 1970.

Personnel
David Crosby – harmony vocals, rhythm guitar
Stephen Stills – lead vocals, organ
Graham Nash – harmony vocals, electric piano
Neil Young – harmony vocals, guitars

Additional musicians
Greg Reeves – bass guitar
Dallas Taylor – drums

Matthews Southern Comfort 

"Woodstock" became an international hit in 1970 and 1971 through a recording by Matthews Southern Comfort. The group performed "Woodstock" on the Live in Concert program broadcast live by BBC Radio 1 on 28 June 1970 – frontman Iain Matthews would recall that the group required an additional song for their set on the scheduled radio session, and that the choice of "Woodstock" was his own suggestion, Matthews having just become familiar with the Joni Mitchell version as he had purchased her Ladies of the Canyon album earlier that week. Due to the positive response to that song, the BBC contacted Matthews's label, Uni Records. According to Matthews, the label "had no idea what the [BBC] were talking about and contacted my management, who asked me about it. Uni suggested that we record the song and add it to the newly recorded Matthews Southern Comfort album, Later That Same Year. I declined to mess with the completed album, but agreed to have them release the song as a single."

According to Matthews his band's BBC Radio performance of "Woodstock" echoed the Joni Mitchell original: however for their studio recording of the song – made at the Willesden Green studio Morgan Sound – the band radically customized the song's arrangement. Matthews would later admit to unease upon eventually meeting Joni Mitchell because he had changed the melody – (Ian Matthews quote:)"I couldn't reach [her] high notes" – but Mitchell replied that she preferred his arrangement. Matthews Southern Comfort bassist Andy Leigh would recall: "We took [the song] apart and reassembled it and we knew we had something. We were an album band. We didn't do singles." In fact, Uni had issued one single off each of the first two of the three Matthews Southern Comfort albums. "But we knew this [track] ... was something special."

MCA Records, Uni's parent company, agreed to release Matthews Southern Comfort's version of "Woodstock" only if the Crosby Stills Nash & Young version failed to chart in the United Kingdom; when that proved to be the case, MCA (Andy Leigh quote:) "reluctantly released ours because of that agreement but they wouldn't spend a penny on promotion ... But our managers, who were excellent, hired a PR, a songplugger. Tony Blackburn, who had the breakfast show on Radio 1, played 'Woodstock' and kept playing it and other DJs started doing the same." Matthews would recall that once Tony Blackburn made "Woodstock" by Matthews Southern Comfort his record of the week, "it began to sell 30,000 copies a day, eventually going from #10 to #1 in a week."

Issued on 24 July 1970, "Woodstock" debuted on the UK Top 50 on 26 September 1970 and reached #1 on 31 October 1970 remaining there for two additional weeks: a #2 hit in Ireland, "Woodstock" also had widespread success on the European continent, charting in Austria (#15), Denmark (#9), Finland (#23), Germany (#27), the Netherlands (#17), Norway (#2), Poland (#2), and Sweden (#2). In early 1971, the track also reached #3 in South Africa, #4 in New Zealand, and was a minor hit in Australia (#55).

In November 1970, "Woodstock" by Matthews Southern Comfort had its US single release on the group's regular US label, Decca Records, another MCA affiliate. Initially the single's US release had only marginal impact, with "Woodstock" by Matthews Southern Comfort spending six weeks on the 101–150 singles chart in Record World in December 1970 – January 1971 and then dropping off having peaked at #110. However upon "Woodstock's" January 1970 single release in Canada – where a 30% Canadian Content radio airplay quota was being phased in – the track received airplay at least partially because of its Canadian authorship, and assisted by airplay on Canadian radio stations with US listeners – notably CKLW, the Windsor ON station credited with the track's Canadian "breakout"- "Woodstock" accrued newfound US interest, debuting on the Billboard Hot 100 dated 6 March 1971 at #83 to rise to a #23 Hot 100 that May. In Canada "Woodstock" reached a #5 peak on the RPM 100 singles chart.

But by the time of the North American success of Matthews Southern Comfort's "Woodstock", the band was no more: an October 1970 shake-up at MCA Records (UK) had resulted in Matthews Southern Comfort splitting with MCA – with the resultant cancellation of a US tour set to begin that November, the month of "Woodstock's" US single release – and in December 1970 Matthews had abruptly quit. Matthews would attribute his departure to the demands incumbent on his band's success with "Woodstock:" (Ian Matthews quote:)"It created all this peripheral stuff that took up my time. What would've been time learning to be a songwriter, it became time spent doing interviews, photographs, tours and appearances;" "It all came to a head after a dreadful soundcheck at Birmingham town hall. I left the building, walked down to the station, got on a train home and locked my door for a week." Matthews' debut solo album If You Saw Thro' My Eyes was a Vertigo Records release of 1 May 1971 while his former co-members – as Southern Comfort – would have three Harvest Records album releases before disbanding in 1972.

In the UK, "Woodstock" would be the final single release by Matthews Southern Comfort – who had had two precedent non-charting UK singles – and "Woodstock" would remain Matthews' sole UK charting single: although previously a member of Fairport Convention Matthews had not been featured on their one charting single: "Si tu dois partir", and Matthews would never rank in the UK charts as a solo artist. In other territories two further tracks were issued as singles from the third and final Matthews Southern Comfort album Later That Same Year – which outside the British Isles included "Woodstock" – : "Mare, Take Me Home" and "Tell Me Why" both of which just made the Billboard Hot 100 at respectively #96 and #98, while "Mare, Take Me Home" peaked at #86 in Canada (Matthews Southern Comfort had a total of four US single releases, having had one non-charting US single: "Colorado Springs Eternal", in April 1970). Iain Matthews – as Ian Matthews – would as a solo act place three singles on the Billboard Hot 100 and also the Canadian charts, one of which: the November 1978 release "Shake It", would become a major hit, reaching a Billboard Hot 100 peak of #13 in April 1979, also reaching #6 in Canada.

Despite his issues with "Woodstock's" success in 1970, Iain Matthews would state in 2017: "Any kind of success in this business takes me by surprise. 'Woodstock' was the first and most exciting. It's still opening new doors to this day."

Chart history

Weekly charts
Crosby, Stills, Nash & Young

Assembled Multitude

Matthews Southern Comfort

Year-end charts
Crosby, Stills, Nash & Young

Matthews Southern Comfort Band

Others 

 Led Zeppelin incorporated Woodstock's lyrics and structure into live renditions of "Dazed and Confused" between 1973 and 1975.
 In 1994 Toto co-founder and long time vocalist Bobby Kimball included a rock version of the song as opener on his solo album Rise Up. Kimball's version is closer to the arrangement of Crosby, Stills, Nash & Young than to Mitchell's original.
 In 1995 Tuck & Patti included their own version of "Woodstock" (with Patti adding scat-singing and percussive vocals in between the verses) in their album "Learning How to Fly."
 In 1997 James Taylor performed "Woodstock" live at the 12th annual Rock and Roll Hall of Fame induction ceremony in tribute to Crosby, Stills, Nash & Young.
 The 2000 album release Time After Time by Eva Cassidy featured her live rendition of "Woodstock" performed at the Maryland Inn in Annapolis in the winter of 1995. Cassidy was a fan of the song due to the Matthews Southern Comfort version.
 A version of "Woodstock" was released on the 2004 album Grace of the Sun by Richie Havens. 
 On her 2008 album A Long and Winding Road, Maureen McGovern sings the first verse and chorus of "Woodstock" as lead-in to her rendition of "Imagine."
 America remade "Woodstock" for their 2012 release Back Pages, a cover album that, according to group member Gerry Beckley, comprises "killer songs that are great examples that come from our best songwriters." Beckley's co-member Dewey Bunnell states: "Joni Mitchell's 'Woodstock' is an anthem for me in the truest sense...a call to action....and I've always been a child of the 60's at heart."
 Jack DeJohnette included the song in his 2017 album Hudson.
 The song "Dimitri Mendeleev" by Astronautalis contains the line "Joni Mitchell said 'we are stardust, we are golden'" in reference to "Woodstock".
 New Zealand recording artist Brooke Fraser released a cover of "Woodstock" on the special edition of her 2010 album Flags. The cover was also included on her 2019 compilation album, B Sides.
In 2017, John Legend recorded a cover of the song as a Spotify Single.
David Crosby re-recorded the song in his 2018 album Here If You Listen, with his Lighthouse Band: Michael League, Becca Stevens and Michelle Willis.

References

External links
  (Joni Mitchell)
  (Crosby, Stills, Nash & Young)
  (Matthews Southern Comfort)

1969 songs
1970 singles
Crosby, Stills, Nash & Young songs
Anti-war songs
Joni Mitchell songs
Songs written by Joni Mitchell
Iain Matthews songs
UK Singles Chart number-one singles
Woodstock Festival
Grammy Award for Best Instrumental Arrangement Accompanying Vocalist(s)
Reprise Records singles
Atlantic Records singles
Uni Records singles
Songs based on American history